The 2004–05 Ekstraklasa is the 79th season of the Polish Football Championship and the 71st season of the Ekstraklasa, the top Polish professional league for association football clubs, since its establishment in 1927.

Overview
14 teams competed in the 2004-05 season. Wisła Kraków won the championship.

League table

Results

Relegation playoffs
The matches were played on 16 and 19 June 2005.

Top goalscorers

References

Ekstraklasa seasons
Poland
1